Wendy Omara Pineda Valdez (born 9 July 1989) is a Guatemalan retired footballer who played as a forward. She has been a member of the Guatemala women's national team.

International career
Pineda capped for Guatemala at senior level during the 2010 CONCACAF Women's World Cup Qualifying (and its qualification) and the 2012 CONCACAF Women's Olympic Qualifying Tournament (and its qualification).

References

1989 births
Living people
Guatemalan women's footballers
Guatemala women's international footballers
Women's association football forwards
Guatemalan women's futsal players